Mount West is a somewhat isolated mountain 9 nautical miles (17 km) southeast of Mount Woodward, surmounting the ice-covered ridge between Hammond and Swope Glaciers, in the Ford Ranges of Marie Byrd Land. Mapped by the United States Antarctic Service (USAS), 1939–41. The name was applied by Paul Siple, commander of the West Base of the USAS, for James E. West, the first Chief Scout Executive of the Boy Scouts of America. Siple's first visit to Antarctica was as a member of the Byrd Antarctic Expedition (1928–30), having been selected as an Eagle Scout for that venture.

References

Mountains of Marie Byrd Land